

Greater than 70,000 m2
In cases where malls have equal areas, they are further ranked by the number of stores.

Less than 70,000 m2
In cases where malls have equal area, they are further ranked by number of stores.

Denotes downtown mall.

Outlet malls
This is a list of outlet shopping malls in Canada.

Denotes enclosed mall.

Outdoor lifestyle and power centres
This is a list of lifestyle center and power center shopping malls in Canada.

Denotes downtown mall.

See also
 List of largest shopping malls in the United States
 List of shopping malls in Montreal
 List of shopping malls in Toronto
 List of shopping malls in Canada
 List of shopping malls in Saskatoon
 List of shopping malls in Greater Longueuil
 List of the world's largest shopping malls
 Montreal underground city malls

References

Shopping malls, largest
Canada, largest
 
Shopping malls, Canada